The People's Democratic Movement (PDM) was a political party in the north-east Indian state of Meghalaya. Founded in 1997, the PDM successfully won three seats in the 1998 Meghalaya Legislative Assembly election. The parties' three representatives were: Martin Danggo, Elston Roy Kharkongor and Cyprian R Sangma. The party failed to win any seats in the 2003 Assembly election and in December 2003 merged with the Indian National Congress (INC).

References

Political parties in Meghalaya
1997 establishments in Meghalaya
Political parties established in 1997
Political parties disestablished in 2003
2003 disestablishments in India